Serdar Ferhad Pasha was an Ottoman statesman of Albanian descent. He was twice grand vizier of the Ottoman Empire between 1 August 1591 and 4 April 1592 and between 16 February 1595 and 7 July 1595.

Career 

He became Agha of the Janissaries in 25 February 1582 but dismissed his position with the effect of Koca Sinan Pasha. In 1582 he appointed as fourth vizier by Grand Visier Siyavus Pasha and joined Ottoman forces during Safewid wars where he soon became second commander (serdar) of the war. He made Tebriz his military base and captured Ganja. He attended peaceful negotiations with Shah Abbas I and turned Istanbul with Safewid embassy. The Treaty of Ferhad Pasha of 1590 ending the Ottoman–Safavid War (1578–1590) (also called the Treaty of Constantinople) was named after him.

His successful military campaign during the Safewid wars carried him to the position of Grand Vizier in 1 August 1591, but he dismissed his position in 4 April 1592 again by the intrigue of Koca Sinan Pasha.

During his second term in office, he commenced a military campaign against Michael the Brave, the ruler who rebelled in Wallachia. He ordered building a bridge between Ruse and Giurgiu to cross Danube river. During preparations, he faced with a military uprising evolving at the gate of Divan-ı Hümayun. More than 1000 kuloğulları requested ulufe(wages) from the grand vizier for their campaign during Safewid Wars but he rejected that claim. Therefore, they infiltrated the troops and organized them against the grand vizier, saying, "We won't accept any ulufe until Ferhad Pasha is decapitated for insulting us." Ferhad Pasha blamed Koca Sinan Pasha and Cığalazade Yusuf Sinan Pasha for that provocation and ordered severe punishment for both. But he convinced for extenuated punishment and exiled Koca Sinan Pasha to Malkara and Cığalazade to Karahisar-ı Şarki.

Ibrahim Pasha, the second vizier, who was appointed as kaymakam to the Porte, incited Sultan Murad III about the dismissal of Ferhad Pasha. On 7 July 1595, while Ferhad Pasha was trying to built a bridge in Ruse, obliged to lost his position again, and Koca Sinan Pasha became grand vizier again that day.

On the other hand, Ferhâd Pasha, who had taken lessons from Ahmed Karahisari during his education in Enderûn-ı Hümâyûn, was also one of the important figures of the culture and art environments of the period. Whenever he had the opportunity from his official duties, he would be busy with copying the mushâf-ı şerîf, he would sell the Qur'an-i-kerîms he wrote and save his money to be used to cover the funeral expenses. Two of the mushafs he wrote are today in the Museum of Turkish and Islamic Arts and the Library of the Topkapı Palace Museum.

According to some sources he was married to daughter of Murad III.

See also
 Treaty of Ferhad Pasha
 List of Ottoman Grand Viziers

References 

16th-century Grand Viziers of the Ottoman Empire
Albanian Grand Viziers of the Ottoman Empire
Year of death unknown
Devshirme
Year of birth unknown
Ottoman people of the Ottoman–Persian Wars